Voietun is a neighbourhood in the city of Kristiansand in Agder county, Norway. The neighborhood is located in the borough of Vågsbygd and in the district of Voiebyen. Voietun is south of Voielia and west of Steindalen.

Transport

References

Geography of Kristiansand
Neighbourhoods of Kristiansand